MTV Classic was a Polish pay television channel which was centred towards airing music videos from the 1960s up to the 1990s. It was launched on 30 May 2002. On 1 December 2005, it was replaced by VH1 Poland.

See also
Media in Poland
MTV Polska
VH1 Polska

References

External links
 

MTV channels
Defunct television channels in Poland
Television channels and stations established in 2002
Television channels and stations disestablished in 2005
2002 establishments in Poland
2005 disestablishments in Poland
Music organisations based in Poland